Sam Hervé Spiegel is a French actor. He has appeared in both French and English language films, television series and plays. Also a voice-over artist and a writer of novels and children's books, Spiegel lives currently in England.

Biography 
Spiegel was born in Metz, Moselle, France. He studied fine art at the Ecole des Beaux Arts in Metz before moving to London, UK. He studied acting in London with Philippe Gaulier, Tony Greco (Actors Studio) in New York, and comedy with Michel Galabru in Paris.

Career 
Spiegel has worked on many occasions for the BBC and portrayed various characters such as ministers, politicians, doctors, gangsters, cops, scientists in series like Roger Roger II, Schubert (as Schubert), Bonekickers and more recently portrayed French Foreign Minister Christian Pineau in The Crown for Netflix. Spiegel has acted in a variety of series for Channel 4 (The Queen's Sister) and ITV (Wing and a Prayer, Hale and Pace) or for France 2 (Le Grand Charles). He also worked for the cinema in France and in the UK with film directors such as Jean-Pierre Mocky, Roger Goldby,  and on stage in various plays. His extensive voice-over work includes voices for Henri Matisse, Charles Baudelaire, voices for TV and radio commercials and corporate projects.

Filmography 

 The Crown, 2017, as Christian Pineau, Netflix, directed by Philip Martin
 The Time of Their Lives, 2017, as The Hotel Manager, directed by Roger Goldby
 Two Timing Terror, (TV series 50 Ways to Kill Your Lover), as Marcel Dupré, directed by Nick Tebbet
 Fermata, Koiz Productions, 2015, as Matiere Gris, directed by Ashkan Kooshanejad
 The Honourable Rebel, THR The Film Ltd, 2015, as French Border Guard, directed by Mike Fraser
 Les Sept de l'Ermitage, Ellipse Productions, 2013, as Octave César, with Michel Galabru, directed by Annie Corbier
 The betrayal of Paul Cézanne, Sunnyside Productions, 2012, as Émile Zola & The card player
 Emulsion, White Lantern Film, 2012, as Professor Pierre Vallade (Psychiatrist & hypnotherapist)
 Pigalle, la nuit, (2009) Lincoln TV, as Nadir's banker (Simon Abkarian), directed by Hervé Hadmar
 Bonekickers, BBC TV, as Henri, French foreman (1 episode, The Lines of War, 2008)
 Le Grand Charles (2006) (TV, France) as Gilbert Renault, aka Colonel Remy
 The Queen's Sister (2005) (TV) as Professor Pierre Lavalle
 Le Furet, Cinema (2003), directed by Jean-Pierre Mocky, as Angel (gangster)
 Ca va se savoir (2002) TV, (Sam Herve Spiegel) as Jean Francois – Entrepreneur
 Largo Winch, TV, as Head technician (1 episode, Nuclear Family, 2001)
 Josephine, ange gardien, TV, France, as Simon – Entrepreneur (1 episode, Romain et Jamila, 2001)
 Wing and a Prayer, TV, Paul, as Denise's Pim (1 episode, 1999)
 Secret D-Day, (1998) (USA, TV), as Juan Pujol, double agent
 Hale and Pace, ITV, TV, in Various Characters (4 episodes, 1998)
 Roger Roger (1996) (TV), as Monsieur Pierre
 Madonna: The Video Collection 93:99 (1999) (V) as a Record producer (in "Drowned World/Substitute for Love" music video)

Stage 
 Country Cooking from Central France: Roast Boned Rolled Stuffed Shoulder of Lamb (Farce Double), 2013, as the French chef, by Harry Mathews
 Night of January 16th, 2008, Detective Elmer Sweeney
 Gipsy Suitcases, (Voyageurs sans voyage), 2004, as Lucas, aka Pepe Milano
 Mary Stuart, Friedrich Schiller, 2002, as Lord William Davison
 Afraid to Fight, (La peur des coups), Courteline, 2001, Lui (the Husband), directed by Michel Galabru
 Lethal Romance, 2001, as American republican Governor Robert T. Tool
 The roaring thirties, 2001, as Seul, the father
 The Secret of Schouane, 2001, parts: Ali, Poter, Taylor, Grocer, The King

Video games 
 Voice of super-villain The Ghost in the French version of the Video game Iron Man 2 (Marvel Comics)
 Voice of super-villain Arnim Zola in the French version of the Video game Captain America: Super Soldier (Marvel Comics)
 Voice of "The Boss" in the French version of the PlayStation game Driver 2.
 Voice of Commander Klaus Zimmermann in the French version of the computer game Dark Omen (Warhammer Fantasy)

External links 
 http://samspiegel.com/ (Official site)
 http://thefrenchvoiceover.com/ (Official site for VoiceOver)
 http://thefrenchactor.com/
 
 Sam H. Spiegel at Spotlight
 http://www.felixdewolfe.com/ (International agent, Wendy Scozzaro for Felix de Wolfe)
 See Pictures

Living people
Actors from Metz
French male voice actors
French emigrants to England
French male film actors
French male television actors
French male video game actors
1957 births